Chilton Colliery Recreation F.C. was an English association football club that played in the FA Cup five times.

Former players
1. Players that have played/managed in the Football League or any foreign equivalent to this level (i.e. fully professional league).
2. Players with full international caps.
3. Players that hold a club record or have captained the club.
 Tom Baker

References

Defunct football clubs in England
Mining association football teams in England
Defunct football clubs in County Durham